Olympic Club Bukavu Dawa is a football club in Bukavu, Democratic Republic of Congo and currently playing in the Linafoot, the top level of professional football in DR Congo and they play at 10,000 capacity Stade de la Concorde.

History
Founded in 1951  Bukavu Dawa won the Coupe du Congo one time in 2008 editions.  and competed in the CAF Confederation Cup in 2007 and 2009.

Honours
Coupe du Congo
 Winners (1): 2008

Linafoot Ligue 2
 Winners (1): 2018–19

Performance in CAF competitions
CAF Confederation Cup: 2 appearances
2007 – First Round
2009 – Preliminary Round

References

External links

 Bukavu Dawa club logo

Bukavu
Football clubs in the Democratic Republic of the Congo